Calbuco is a city and commune in Llanquihue Province, Chile.

Calbuco may also refer to:

In Los Lagos Region, Chile:
 Calbuco Department, Chiloé, a department of Chiloé from 1834 to 1855
 Calbuco Department, Llanquihue, a department of Llanquihue from 1937 to 1975
 Calbuco Archipelago
 Calbuco Island, an island in the commune of Calbuco, containing the city Calbuco
 Fort Calbuco
 Calbuco Channel, a channel separating Calbuco Island from mainland
 Calbuco River (Llanquihue), a river in the commune of Puerto Varas
 Calbuco (volcano), a volcano in the commune of Puerto Montt

In other parts of Chile:
 Calbuco River (Cautín), a river in Cautín Province, Araucanía Region
 Estero Calbuco, a creek in the commune of Mulchén, Biobío Province, Bío-Bío Region